Tetracona pictalis is a snout moth in the subfamily Spilomelinae of the family Crambidae. It was described by Warren in 1896. It is found in Australia, where it has been recorded in Queensland. The habitat consists of rainforests.

The wingspan is about 30 mm. Adults are pale yellow with brilliant red and blue patches on the wing margins.

References

Moths described in 1896
Spilomelinae
Moths of Australia